Sir William Alfred Stevenson  (19 May 1901 – 29 November 1983) was a New Zealand industrialist, philanthropist and local-body politician. He was also active in rowing, both as a competitor and official, and was a noted big-game fisherman.

Biography

Stevenson was born in 1901, the son of Laura (née Paterson) and William Stevenson, who in 1913 founded the company that would grow into the Stevenson Group.

He was educated at Albany Primary School on Auckland's North Shore and began working as a carpenter for his father. In 1921 the business expanded into construction. Stevenson and his brother Jim took over after their father became ill, and later his sons Bill, Jack and Ross became involved, the company eventually becoming a major contracting firm that was registered as a company on 24 September 1931.

William Alfred Stevenson Married Ruby Charlotte Ross (b.1897) in 1924, and they lived in Bulls, Pahiatua and Sanson while WA moved around the north island for work. Their first son also William Alfred (Bill) was born in 1928, followed by John Kennedy (Jack, b.1929), and then James Ross (Ross b.1932 in Palmerston North), before the family relocated to Karaka near Auckland around 1938.  In 1939 WA purchased a Homestead and land in Cockle Bay, Howick and Daughter Colleen Margaret Rose (b.1942) completed the family. 

He served as chairman of the Howick Town Board from 1944 to 1947, and was the second mayor of Howick, following its inauguration as a borough, from 1953 to 1962.

Stevenson won New Zealand single and double sculls rowing titles between 1923 and 1926. Later, he managed the rowing camp at Lake Karapiro for the 1950 British Empire Games, coached and managed the New Zealand rowing team to the 1954 British Empire and Commonwealth Games in Vancouver, and was manager of the New Zealand rowing team at the 1964 Summer Olympics in Tokyo.

A horse breeder and owner, Stevenson enjoyed success with his horse Jandell, whose wins included the 1973 Avondale Guineas, and the 1975 Queen Elizabeth Stakes at Randwick in Sydney, beating champion mare Leilani.

In 1958, Stevenson purchased the  Lochinver Station on the Rangitaiki Plains between Napier and Taupo, and transformed it into a productive farming operation with a carrying capacity of over 100,000 stock units.
As a philanthropist, Stevenson supported many causes and charities, and was particularly interested in the medical area, donating to various hospitals, St. John Ambulance, and endowing chairs in orthopaedic surgery and ophthalmology and an associate professorship in plastic surgery at the University of Auckland.

In the 1954 New Year Honours, Stevenson was appointed an Officer of the Order of the British Empire for services to the community, and he was promoted to Knight Commander of the same order in the 1965 New Year Honours. He was appointed a Commander of the Order of St John in 1962, made an honorary member of the Royal Australasian College of Surgeons in 1975, and, in 1978, awarded an honorary DSc by the University of Auckland.Personal Motto of Sir William Alfred "Alf" Stevenson  "DEO ADJUVANTE LABOR PROFICIT"

Humble beginnings 
Born in 1901 in Auckland, Sir William left Albany Primary School, North Harbour at age 17 to join the drainage business of his father, William Stevenson.  In 1921, the firm bought a Model-T Ford, three wheelbarrows and some picks and shovels and branched out into the construction business.  Sir William took over the firm after his father fell ill and later brought in his three sons, Bill, Jack and Ross.  Education might not have played a significant part in his success but practical skills and courage certainly did.  Among his first contracts was the drainage tunnels into the volcanic strata of Mt Eden, Auckland and the hard clay of New Lynn, West Auckland. This involved Sir William spending hours underground using a tap drilling method.  But it was on the outfalls at Devonport and Takapuna on Auckland's North Shore and at New Plymouth that another of Sir William's skills- skin-diving- came to the fore.  He would go down 15ft to place gelignite under sealed rocks without the aid of a snorkel.  His "wetsuit" was a pair of saddle-tweed pants and a generous coating of hammer of grease.  During World War II, W Stevenson & Sons Ltd was awarded several key military contracts and after the war it won major North Island construction contracts including those for much of Auckland's Southern Motorway, the Greenlane- Penrose bypass, the Glenbrook steel mill site and the Nihotupu  dam in the Waitakere Ranges.  The most significant of these projects was the 1948 removal of overburden at Kopuku Opencast Coal Mine – this project lasted over 39 years.

Domestic life at Waikiteroa 
With the business growing WA bought a homestead and five acres on the cliff at Cockle Bay in 1939 and moved there with the family.  This white weatherboard home, with its orange tiled roof and long driveway was surrounded by extensive lawns, orchards, and gardens, with 45 acres of adjacent farmland for grazing cattle and keeping horses.  The house had been named Waikiteroa meaning 'long water view'.  The boys started school in Howick, often riding ponies there.  WA built stables and bred ponies, then as the boys got older, he bred hunters.  Later they also got involved in thoroughbreds, breeding horse racers and trotters.  WA also built a full-sized boxing ring in an old tennis pavilion that he had obtained from the Takapuna Tank Farm site and each week an ex heavyweight boxing champion, Mack McCarthy, used to come to train the three brothers.  At Howick the three boys shared an outside bedroom where a fourth bed was periodically used by Grandpa Stevenson.  Grandpa Stevenson unfortunately was later diagnosed with dementia and had to be moved to a care home.  Grandpa Ross also lived there in a converted garage and helped with the gardens. 

Colleen's early childhood was more settled than her brothers as they had moved frequently and by the time Colleen arrived WA and Ruby had moved into the comfortable Howick house, and they never moved again.  The house was much admired for its expansive gardens.  Ruby's gardening loves were ferns kept in an enclosed verandah, and a rockery planted with bluebells and other traditional plants.  WA took care of the vast rose collection and the myriad of fruit trees.  In the garden wisteria grew over a pergola to shelter plants that favored dark and damp conditions, in later years this grotto became a favorite place for the grandchildren to play.  Even after WA had relinquished much of the gardening work on the property he continued to care for the fruit trees when he was in his 70's.  Unfortunately he was on a slope in the orchard when he slipped and fell and wound up having to have hip replacement surgery.  This gave him the idea to build a swimming pool at home to help his rehabilitation.  The family had a pet budgie called Peter and a collie dog called Pat. Pat was so gentle he even allowed young Colleen to ride his back.  At Christmas everything was cooked out of the garden, Lady Ruby and the housekeeper would make a traditional pudding months before.  Later on the meat came from Lochinver, and at the back of Drury Quarry there were turkeys which they would also enjoy for Christmas dinner.  There was a food storage safe in a tree near the clothesline and Ruby would pull a string to lower and raise it.  The wind would blow through the tree and keep the butter, milk, cooked meat cool for a day or two.

Family man 
Wednesday night was poker night and usually involved two or three couples, including Jeff Jeffries the gardener and his wife.  They would play with pennies and matchsticks and everyone would bring a plate of sandwiches for supper at 10pm.  The Jeffries lived in a cottage on the property, as well as being gardener Jeff used to work as a truck driver for the firm.  

A film room was built at the house with a pull down screen and WA would bring home 16mm movies for the family and friends to enjoy on Wednesdays and Saturdays.  He was also an avid collector of Dresden China, collecting pieces every time he went overseas.

There was a small shelly beach at the bottom of the garden which was reached by a green painted wooden zig zag stairway.  Later they built a shed with a speed boat in it to follow the rowers as they practiced.  The children would boil cockles in a billy and serve them in bread with salt and pepper on the beach.  Later WA employed someone full time to attend to the horses.  Colleen's job on Mondays was to poke the bed sheets underwater in the copper boiled over a fire.  Later on she was allowed to turn the handle for the wringer washing machine.  

With WA working long hours the boys were given regular chores and were expected to help keep the property in order.  They had to mow the vast lawns once a week, two pairs of WA's boots had to be cleaned each morning, the cars washed twice a week, plus feeding the horses all the while going to Howick District High School. 

Lady Ruby's sister Muriel was unmarried and also lived with the Stevensons on and off;  she largely looked after Colleen when she stayed.  From age 5 Colleen attended boarding school at St Annes School in Takapuna.  Every two weeks she would return home for a half day on Sundays to enjoy a traditional roast dinner with her brothers and parents.  The dining room looked over the harbour and there was a great view of the boats passing by.  The boys went on to attend Auckland Grammar School and at the age of 12 Colleen moved to board at Diocesan School for Girls in the city.  WA bought a 200 acre farm at Whitford during the war where he had horses, this was later sold at a reduced price on the understanding that it would be developed as a country club.  The Whitford Park Golf Club opened on the site in 1968 with swimming pools, tennis courts and other facilities.  In conjunction with the RSA, proceeds from the sale went to fund Stevenson Village, a returned servicemen's housing complex.

Summer holidays were spent at the family bach at Rotoiti.  It was a five hour drive with the family stopping at Cambridge for an ice-cream and fresh sandwiches.  While the bach was eventually fitted with modern appliances it was a basic house without electricity for many years.  Nights were spent listening to the wind up phonograph, playing carpet bowls, and sitting in front of the fire.  The uninsulated corrugated roof made listening to the rain a pleasure.  WA didn't want the phone there for years, if he wanted to check for messages he would go in the boat to the Post Office and use their phone.  Electricity and phone lines were eventually installed and a green asphalt tennis court was also added.  WA enjoyed fishing on the lake, often taking other businessmen, and they smoked trout in a purpose built shed on the property.  WA also bought a property at Tarawera and employed a boatman, Norm Keene, to maintain both the boats and properties.   When the children became adults and married;  Bill to Nari, Jack to Pam, Ross to Norma and Colleen to Don, the Waikiteroa residence remained a special place to celebrate family gatherings such as birthdays and Christmases surrounded by their four children, their spouses and thirteen grandchildren.

Business man 
Sir William's other achievements were equally impressive.  A first-class rower, he was NZ single-skulls champion in 1923, 1924, 1926 and 1927. He was double-skulls champion in 1925 and 1926. Years later, he did his best to turn a disused quarry beside Auckland's Lakė Pupuke into an international rowing course but eventually settled "for Lake Karapiro". In 1950, he was named manager of the Empire games rowing camp at Karapiro and four years later he managed the NZ rowing contingent to the Vancouver Empire Games. In 1964 he was appointed manager of  the NZ team to the Tokyo Olympics- the team that included Peter Snell, Murray Halberg and John Davies. Privately, Sir William's donations and endowments were impressive. These ranged from financing the rebuilding of St Thomas Church, St Heliers, Auckland, and generous equipment donations to hospitals, endowing the chairs of orthopedics and plastic surgery and a lectureship in ophthalmic studies at Auckland University and helping set up the Laura Fergusson Trust for Disabled persons.  In spite of Sir William's extensive business interests, be found time for local-body politics, fishing, breeding horses and financing Lochinver Station on the Napier/Taupo Road which was developed by his son, Ross Snr.  In 1979 Sir William broke a five-year-old world fishing record, catching a Black Marlin off Cairns weighing 1,231.5lbs.  He never became obsessed with wealth or the intricacies of high finance.  He told the Auckland Star in 1970: "Finance was never one of my greatest worries because I knew what I could do and where I was heading ... Big finance is only a matter of common-sense.... Sir William's governance of WA Stevenson & Sons was characterized by grit, hard work, self belief and determination. The years following were marked by expansive growth and diversification, which eventually built Stevenson's into one of New Zealand's major contractors. "What is success?  It is the pride of achievement."

Sportsman 
When asked what was the basis of Sir William's staggering success in business and life in general, the answer came simply: "Why – sport of course"

The rower 

Sir William started rowing in the late 1900s- fours, eights and pairs, as all young oarsmen do before specializing in any particular class of rowing.  Single sculls drew the Stevenson preference and he became a four time New Zealand Single Sculls Champion, starting in 1922 in Auckland Rowing Club colors.  In 1923 at Bluff he became the only New Zealander at that time to win the Single and Double Sculls (with Doug Smith) on the same day.  This was repeated in Dunedin in 1924 (1925) and winning again in 1926. During the latter period Sir William was rowing for the Waitemata Rowing Club whose headquarters were then opposite the Railway Station on the waterfront road storage area.  He competed in the Henley-On-Yarra Regatta at Melbourne in 1927 achieving second to the World's Champion of that period in the Single Sculls.  Unfortunately around the late 1920s he was forced to abandon rowing while still in his prime, to concentrate his efforts on the pressures of a growing business.  A little over two decades later he came back to the rowing world to take up the role of Coach for two of his sons, Bill and Jack, who he coached as a Double Sculls crew in the late 1940s.  History repeated itself, when in 1952, 30 years later after his own success in the same Championships, he coached Jack into first place in the National Single Sculls Championship in Wellington.  That same day, another father/son record was taken when Jack and Bill Hunter won the Double Sculls.

The father/son team continued their success in the following years with Jack claiming seven more NZ titles.  In 1954 Sir William coached Don Rowlands to the Empire Games in Vancouver, where another double achievement was realized when he was made Manager of the Rowing Team.  Don Rowlands was successful in winning a Gold Medal. Sir William continued to assist Don in his sculling career on their return home and Don went on to win six NZ titles. With interests in the Waikato – Roose Shipping etc, Sir William came closer to the Mercer Rowing Club where he coached a four to take the NZ Championship at Invercargill in 1955. That crew consisted of Charlie Lofroth, Paul Bridgeman, Bob Parker and Norm Cox,  all of whom worked for W. Stevenson & Sons Limited at some stage.  There was however, one trophy Sir William had never coached a crew for, that being the Thompson Memorial Gold Cup for Inter-Businesshouse Rowing.  In 1959 Jack suggested a crew and Sir William took up the challenge.  Rules for the competition stated two experienced oarsmen, Jack in the Stroke seat and Paul Bridgeman in the No.3 seat and two novice oarsmen, Jon Twigg in the No.2 seat and Earle Wells in the bow.  The coxswain was Colin Gray.  This crew all worked at Kopuku at that time and trained on the river at Mercer.  So it was, that after several months of hard training, lots of practice and perseverance on behalf of Sir William, he had the satisfaction of seeing his crew win the Thompson Memorial on the Tamaki River.  Rowing Administration bore the Stevenson mark.  Auckland and Waitemata Committee's in his youth, the Auckland Rowing Assoc.  in the late 50s and later Vice President and President of the NZ Rowing Assoc.  All this, along with the assistance given many crews from clubs and colleges around the Province made Sir William one of the leading figures in the New Zealand rowing world.  He held all three Champion Jackets, i.e.  A Red Coat (indicating a National Champion);  a Green Coat (having Coached a National Champion] and the Black NZ Representative Jacket. Jack also holds all three jackets, which is a NZ father/son record that still stands.

The Fisherman 
Watersport was well and truly injected into the Stevenson veins for another favorite pursuit was that of fishing.  A young William Stevenson started his fishing career playing eels in the local Albany creeks.  Almost seven decades later he had fished all over the globe from the lakes of NZ, the tropics of Australia and the Hawaiian Islands to the freezing North Atlantic waters off Canada's New Brunswick and caught almost every game fish there is to catch.  The mark of a true sportsmran was left on many a fin, when, having fought and won the battle with the greats of the ocean, they were tagged and released to freedom.  Despite this he had several game fishing records to his credit.  The most meritorious being the "Big Three".  55 While fishing off Cairns in October 1970 during a particularly good game fishing season, Sir William broke World Record of five years with a Black Marlin weighing in at 1,231½lb.  A fitting tribute to a truly magnificent fish.  Giant Bluefin (tuna) had always interested Sir William – he had taken big ones off New Foundland and the Bahamas but the quest for a 1,000lb tuna to go with the 1,000lb billfish was a hard one as there had been probably no more than to  fifteen ever landed on rod and reel.  However in 1975 at Carracut, New Brunswick, in the St Laurence estuary the search paid off. After the disappointment of losing the first giant, estimate around 1,200lb, while the wire was in the mates hand and just out of the gaffing range, another  thrill was realized when he landed a 1,080lb Blue Fin just 40lb short of another World Record.  Half the unique challenge was met and the search was on for the magic four figure shark.  In June 1976 Queensland's Cape Moreton, famous for its great white sharks whose feeding grounds were associated with the now discontinued whaling stations, was chosen for the most likely success.  It was, however, a Tiger Shark that clinched "The Big Three" when, after what was considered probably unprecedented fishing – four tigers over 800lb in four hours, the last monster caught weighed in at 1,002lb.  Sir William's fishing feats were recognized in NZ when in 1976 he was awarded the "Old Man of the Sea" trophy for the most meritorious catch.

The horse owner 
Sir William included racing in his wide range of sporting interests with notable success.  He started racing horses in the 1950s, and his love for horses led him into establishing his own thoroughbred stud at Whitford.  On many occasions through the years his yearlings topped the national sales and he had in many cases added delight of watching his foals turn into winners.  Between the mid-1960s and the  mid-1970s he enjoyed much success with horses such as Miss Shona, Kerry Dawn, Marandellas and Mikasha.  Nipawin, winner of many races including the Parliamentary Handicap in 1969;  Sheralee, the top two-year-old for her year and winner of many races as a three-year-old contributed by more than half to make Sir William 4th leading stakes owner in New Zealand for the season ending July 1971.  Moonmist (the only horse mentioned here not bred from his own mares) was winner of eight races and gave Brian Andrews his 100th win in the 1971 season, making him only the 4th jockey at that time to enjoy such success.  Probably Sir William's favorite was the filly Jandell, a grand mare winner of many classic races and cups, culminating in her victory over Leilani, the top Australian mare, in the Queen Elizabeth Stakes at Sydney in April 1975. Jandell was named by sports writers as  "Australasian Filly of the Year", which gave Sir William much pride and satisfaction.  Jandell has progeny from champion sires such as Balmerino and Sir Tristram, and Sir William was elated when she produced a filly from the top sire Sovereign Edition in 1981. The filly was named Janzome and was shaping up to be as outstanding as her mother.  She won her first race in the two-year-old trials, by 10 lengths, but then tragedy struck.  While on a training run she broke her leg so severely that it was doubtful if she would live.  Sir William sought expert advice and with a remarkable piece of veterinary skill, she was saved as a brood mare. In the early 1980s, Sir William ventured into standardbred racing, having dabbled a little with Red Slipper back in the 1950s and was successful with Debbie Direct and his pacer Never Bend, who won six races before going to the US.  His last purchase was a yearling named Empire Lobell now rated as an open class trotter and since Sir William's death in 1983 had been raced by Bill, Jack and Ross Stevenson with moderate success.

Other sporting moments 
In 1950 he was named Manager of the Empire Games Rowing Camp at Karapiro, having spent months totally landscaping and grassing over half a mile of the riverbank to provide spectator accommodation for thousands of people at his own cost.  In 1954 he was named manager – coach of the NZ Rowing contingent to the Empire Games in Vancouver.

He assisted numerous sporting clubs with funds and services, from Rugby League to Golf – a four-oared boat for the Rotorua Rowing Club – a rowing training tank in Auckland – funds for overseas competition for athletes of all codes – laying the Lovelock athletic track –  where others just talked about, Sir William moved in and did it. 

  The New Year Honors List of 1954 listed Mr. W.A.  Stevenson of Howick as being awarded the OBE (Officer of the Most Excellent Order of the British Empire) for Service in the field of Sport and Social Welfare and he was invested by the Queen at Wellington, during the Royal Tour of that year.  For, not only did he achieve success as a competitor himself, but also ensured that others were given the opportunity to further their own sporting careers.  Perhaps Sir William's proudest after many years of association with all codes of sport culminated in his appointment as manager of the NZ team to the Tokyo Olympics.  That pride would have been complete when Jack Stevenson was named Manager of the Rowing section.

Supporting Community 
As his business flourished and Sir William turned his hand to the administration of its growth, he was able to give back to his community some of the fruits of his endeavors, Sir William played an active part in local body politics for sixteen years-  nine of those years were spent as Mayor of Howick, during which time he offered as a gift to the Government in 1958 the family farm at Cockle Bay, for the Vice-Regal Residence (the property we know now as Waikiteroa Subdivision): drained and  developed Nixon Park for Bowling Greens;  provided grants of thousands of dollars to local sporting clubs, schools and service organizations.  In 1961 he set up a special trust for an annual award to enable and encourage young engineers to work and study overseas to improve their knowledge and techniques in civil engineering construction.  His involvement with opencast mining at Kopuku led him to provide funds for the establishment of a Fellowship to accelerate coal research in 1964. In 1968 Sir William and Lady Stevenson provided funds to purchase the historic Shamrock Cottage which they handed over to the Howick Borough council enabling  restoration work to be carried out.  The Stevenson Village- a pensioner housing project with recreational and hospital facilities- is further tribute to the benevolence of Sir William and Lady Stevenson.  The Village, opened May 1975, was run in conjunction with the Howick RSA of which Sir William was Patron for over 20 years.

Philanthropist 
Another gift from Sir William to the people of Auckland was in 1958 when he rebuilt St Thomas' Church in Kohimarama.  The Church was constructed in the grounds of the old St Thomas' in 1947 and condemned as dangerous only 17 years later.  The designs based on the original structure only larger, were drawn up by Mr. Murray Le Grice, an Engineer with W. Stevenson & Sons at that time.  In keeping with his marine interests, Sir William sponsored the late Kelly Tarlton and co-diver Wade Doak in 1968 in the excavation and salvage of the "Boyd", which was burnt and sunk in Whangaraoa Harbour in 1809. Many of the salvaged artefacts are  now on display in Northland Museums.  Boaties who have strained their eyes in the darkness looking for a safe approach to Kawau Island have probably heaved a sigh of relief once sighting the familiar "Martello 'light, to guide them past the dangers of the outer reefs. Few would realize that the true  thanks should go to Sir William, who in 1962 financed the two automatic electronic beacons. One was placed on Martello Rock, the other on Kawati Point and named, on Sir William's instruction, Dyson and Thornton lights respectively after two former Senior Auckland Engineers.

Supporting Medicine 

It was however, the medical research and surgical fields that captured the true interest and respect of Sir William.  Having enjoyed good health himself, he did everything in his power to ensure that others less fortunate led a comfortable life.  In 1962 Sir William provided funds for the building and setting up of the University of Auckland Anatomy School at Greenlane hospital, enabling courses in physiology and pathology to be undertaken in Auckland.  In 1965 he financed a lecture course in Auckland in cardiac surgery and heart-lung physiology attended by the worlds leading surgeons, amongst them, Dr Christian Barnard. 

In 1975 Sir William endowed two teaching chairs at the Auckland University School of Medicine.  Through the establishment of a Trust, the chair in Orthopedic Surgery enabled teaching and research and provided funds for research and development in Orthopedic Surgery.  The second chair was that of Plastic and Reconstructive Surgery which funded teaching and research in that area.  He also provided Middlemore Hospital with micro-surgery equipment necessary for plastic surgery.  In 1977 Sir William endowed a further Chair at the Auckland School of Medicine known as the Sir William and Lady Stevenson Chair of Ophthalmology.  It was the first established professorship in NZ dealing with and made Sir William the only person to have established three chairs at the University.  He also provided Christchurch Hospital with equipment for diagnosing certain diseases of the eyes.  eye diseases Sir William gained enormous please from meeting people who had benefited from his benevolence.  They included a man who, unable to see for seven years because of an eye disease was able to drive his car following surgery;  a man, who after a factory accident had his hand sewn on again using the micro-surgery equipment and Middlemore and numerous people underwent cardiac surgery with equipment provided by himself.  In 1983 he set up the Sir William and Lady Stevenson Deafness Research Fellowship, funding research and development in deafness and related ear problems.

Death and legacy 
On 29 November 1983, Stevenson died at the age of 82. In 1995, he was posthumously inducted into the New Zealand Business Hall of Fame.

References

1901 births
1983 deaths
People from Auckland
20th-century New Zealand businesspeople
Mayors of places in the Auckland Region
New Zealand philanthropists
New Zealand male rowers
New Zealand referees and umpires
New Zealand fishers
New Zealand racehorse owners and breeders
New Zealand Knights Commander of the Order of the British Empire
Commanders of the Order of St John
20th-century New Zealand politicians
20th-century philanthropists